Nicola Kuhn was the defending champion but chose not to defend his title.

Benjamin Bonzi won the title after defeating Tim van Rijthoven 7–6(12–10), 3–6, 6–4 in the final.

Seeds

Draw

Finals

Top half

Bottom half

References

External links
Main draw
Qualifying draw

Open Castilla y León - 1
2021 Singles
2021 Open Castilla y León